Perto de Deus (in English: "Near God") is an album of Brazilian reggae band Cidade Negra, released in 2004.

Track listing

Se Alguém Jah Amou (Da Gama, Garrido, Lazão) - 3:12
Perto de Deus (Da Gama, Farias, Garrido) - 3:39
Sinais (Garrido, Lazão) - 3:27
Selva de Pedra (Lazão, Marley, Yazbek) - 4:31
Eu Sei Que Ela (Garrido, Lazão, Yazbeck) - 3:29
Homem Que Faz a Guerra (Da Gama, Farias, Garrido, Lazão) - 4:31
Obrigado (Da Gama, Farias, Garrido) - 3:42
Além de Onda (Da Gama, Vilhena) - 4:01
Ancestrais (Garrido) - 3:52
Régia (Garrido) - 4:11
Dia Livre (Da Gama, Farias, Garrido) - 3:50
Busy Busy (Farias, Da Gama, Garrido, Lazão) - 4:16
Retratos da Vida (Da Gama, Meriti) - 3:58
Tô de Cara (Lazão) - 4:02

Credits
Keyboards: Aleix Meirelles, Jean Pierre
Saxophone: Marcelo Martins
Vocals: Gil Miranda
Mixing: Collin "Bulbie" York
Trumpet: Jessé Sadoc
Trombone, arranger: Marlon Sette
Executive producer: Leninha Brandão
Guitar, arranger, composer: Sergio Yazbeck
Art supervisor: Daniela Conolly, Sandro Mesquita

References

Cidade Negra albums
2004 albums